The Katholieke Hogeschool Zuid-West-Vlaanderen or KATHO was a university college in West Flanders. It had four campuses: Kortrijk, Roeselare, Tielt and Torhout. Since September 1, 2002, KATHO was a member of the K.U.Leuven Association. In 2013, KATHO merged with Katholieke Hogeschool Vives Noord (KHBO) and formed Hogeschool VIVES.

KATHO had seven departments 

Kortrijk:
 HANTAL
 Ipsoc
 HIVV
 VHTI

Roeselare:
 HIVB

Tielt:
 PHO

Torhout:
 RENO

See also 
 Education in Belgium

References

Catholic universities and colleges in Belgium
Colleges in Belgium
Buildings and structures in West Flanders
Buildings and structures in Kortrijk
Roeselare
Torhout